Sayella hemphillii is a species of minute sea snail, a marine gastropod mollusk in the family Pyramidellidae, the pyrams and their allies.

Description
The shell grows to a length of 4 mm.

Distribution
This species occurs in the following locations:
 Gulf of Mexico (Florida, Texas)

References

 Dall, W. H. (1884). On a collection of shells sent from Florida by Mr. Henry Hemphill. Proceedings of the United States National Museum 6(384): 318-342, pl. 10
 Rehder, H. A. 1935. New Caribbean marine shells. Nautilus 48: 127-130

External links
 To Biodiversity Heritage Library (4 publications)
 To Encyclopedia of Life
 To ITIS
 To World Register of Marine Species

Pyramidellidae
Gastropods described in 1884